Bogalusa is a city in Washington Parish, Louisiana, United States. The population was 12,232 at the 2010 census. In the 2020 census the city, town, place equivalent reported a population of 10,659. It is the principal city of the Bogalusa Micropolitan Statistical Area, which includes all of Washington Parish and is also part of the larger New Orleans–Metairie–Hammond combined statistical area.

The name of the city derives from the Choctaw language term bogue lusa, which translates into English as "dark water or "smoky water". Located in an area of pine forests, in the early 20th century, this industrial city was developed as a company town, to provide worker housing and services in association with a Great Southern Lumber Company sawmill. In the late 1930s, this operation was replaced with paper mills and chemical operations.

History

Founding
Incorporated in 1914, Bogalusa is one of the youngest towns in Louisiana. It was founded by Frank Henry Goodyear and Charles Waterhouse Goodyear, lumber barons of Buffalo, New York. In the early 1900s, the brothers bought hundreds of thousands of acres of virgin Longleaf pine forests in southeastern Louisiana and southwestern Mississippi for the timber and further their strategy to build railroad spurs to bring the wood to market. In 1902, they chartered the Great Southern Lumber Company (1908–38) and built the first sawmill in what became Bogalusa, a company town built to support the mill. The sawmill was the largest in the world at the time. The Goodyear interests built the city of Bogalusa to house workers and supervisors, and associated infrastructure. They also built the Great Northern New Orleans Railroad to New Orleans to transport their lumber and products to market.

The city, designed by architect Rathbone DeBuys of New Orleans and built from the ground up in less than a year, had several hotels, schools, a hospital, a YMCA and YWCA, churches of all faiths, and houses for the mill workers. The town was laid out with the "Mill Town" on the south side and "Commercial Town" on the north side, altogether there were four quadrants with racially segregated neighborhoods defined by the railroad running north–south and Bogue Lusa Creek running east–west. It was called the "Magic City" in praise of its rapid construction. The manager of Great Southern Lumber Company was William H. Sullivan. As sawmill manager, he acted as town boss when the city was built. After Bogalusa was incorporated as a city on July 4, 1914, Sullivan was elected as mayor by white voters (blacks had been disenfranchised), and repeatedly re-elected, serving until his death on June 26, 1929.

The Great Southern Lumber Company's sprawling sawmill produced up to a million board feet (2400 m3) of lumber each day. With the virgin pine forest cleared, the sawmill closed in 1938 during the Great Depression. An attempt to keep the sawmill open with California redwood proved too costly, and the mill was closed. It was replaced by the Bogalusa Paper Company (a subsidiary of Great Southern). In 1937 Bogalusa Paper Company merged with Gaylord Container Corporation; a chemical plant also run by Gaylord was built next to the mill. Crown-Zellerbach acquired Gaylord's operations in 1955. The paper mill and chemical operations continued to anchor the city's economy.

At its peak in 1960, the city had more than 21,000 residents. In 1985 Crown-Zellerbach was split up but the timber industry continued.

Racial conflicts
In 1919 workers went on strike, triggering the largest labor strife at the town's Great Southern Lumber Company, the largest sawmill in the world. Company owners supported a white militia group and brought in Black strikebreakers, increasing racial tension. Events culminated in the Bogalusa sawmill killings which saw four union men killed. On August 31, 1919, Black veteran Lucius McCarty was accused of assaulting a white woman and a mob of some 1,500 people seized McCarty and shot him more than 1,000 times. The mob then dragged his corpse behind a car through the black neighborhoods before burning his body in a bonfire.

Civil rights era
Both black and white industrial workers had come to the company town for work since the early 20th century. After World War II and service for their country, African-American veterans struggled in Louisiana and the South against the oppression of Jim Crow laws, state segregation, and disenfranchisement and exclusion from the political system, all continuing since the turn of the 20th century.

During the civil rights era, black workers pressed Crown-Zellerbach to open all positions to them, promote them to supervisory positions, and otherwise give them equal opportunities at work. White workers resisted these changes. Similarly, blacks pressured the city of Bogalusa to integrate public facilities, especially after passage of the Civil Rights Law of 1964.

In Bogalusa, black workers also struggled against the industrial class system. As their activism increased in the civil rights era, whites resisted. Local Ku Klux Klan members dominated the region, attacking and intimidating civil rights activists in the 1960s. In 1964, as civil rights activists continued to push for their constitutional rights after congressional passage that year of the Civil Rights Act that year, whites increased their resistance.

Determined to fight for their rights, Bob Hicks, Charles Sims,  A.Z. Young, and others had taken leadership of the (all-black) Bogalusa Civic and Voters’ League. On February 21, 1965, with the help of three activists from the Deacons for Defense and Justice based in Jonesboro, Louisiana, they founded the first affiliated chapter of that African-American self-defense organization. Other leaders of the Deacons were Bert Wyre, Aurilus “Reeves” Perkins, Sam Bonds, Fletcher Anderson, and others. They mobilized many war veterans within the black community to provide armed security to civil rights activists and their families. Expecting a violent summer, the State Police established an office in Bogalusa in February 1965.

As explained by Seth Hague, 
...the community came to embrace the militant rhetoric of the Jonesboro Deacons. Many violent conflicts ensued under this ideology and culminated in a climactic summer in 1965. Consequently, the black workers’ militancy threatened not only the power of the middle class blacks, but also the political and economic hegemony of the white power structure in Bogalusa. Except for a few noteworthy courtroom "victories" versus Crown-Zellerbach, threatening the power structure was virtually the struggle's only effect as the white power structure subsumed the militancy and rhetoric of the revolutionary Bogalusans."

Two unsolved murders of African Americans took place in Bogalusa during the civil rights era: killed in 1965 was Oneal Moore, the first black deputy sheriff hired for the Washington Parish Sheriff's Office, and in 1966 Clarence Triggs was killed.

1970 to present
With changes in the lumber industry, through the late 20th century, after 1960, a steady decline in industrial operations, jobs, and associated population of the town occurred. By 2015, the population was estimated at slightly less than 12,000, more than 40% below the high in 1960. These conditions have made it more difficult for remaining residents.

In 1995, a railroad tank car imploded at Gaylord Chemical Corporation, releasing nitrogen tetroxide and forcing the evacuation of about 3,000 people within a one-mile (1.6 km) radius. Residents say "the sky turned orange" as a result. Emergency rooms filled with about 4,000 people who complained of burning eyes, skin, and lungs. Dozens of lawsuits were filed against Gaylord Chemical and were finally settled in May 2005, with compensation checks issued to around 20,000 people affected by the accident.

Many buildings in Bogalusa were damaged from falling trees, and several were destroyed. Most of the houses, businesses, and other buildings suffered roof damage from the storm's ferocious winds. Some outlying areas of the city were without power for more than a month.

Geography

Climate

According to the Köppen Climate Classification system, Bogalusa has a humid subtropical climate, abbreviated "Cfa" on climate maps.

Demographics

2020 census

As of the 2020 United States census, there were 10,659 people, 4,874 households, and 2,923 families residing in the city.

2000 census
As of the census of 2000,  13,365 people, 5,431 households, and 3,497 families resided in the city. The 6,300 housing units averaged 663.5 per square mile (256.3/km). The racial makeup of the city was 57.18% White, 41.21% African American, 0.32% Native American, 0.39% Asian, 0.16% from other races, and 0.73% from two or more races. Hispanics or Latinos of any race were 0.75% of the population.

Of the 5,431 households, 29.3% had children under the age of 18 living with them, 36.1% were married couples living together, 23.8% had a female householder with no husband present, and 35.6% were not families. About 32.7% of all households were made up of individuals, and 16.5% had someone living alone who was 65 years of age or older. The average household size was 2.41 and the average family size was 3.05.

In the city, the population was distributed as  27.4% under the age of 18, 9.2% from 18 to 24, 23.9% from 25 to 44, 21.3% from 45 to 64, and 18.2% who were 65 years of age or older. The median age was 37 years. For every 100 females, there were 82.7 males. For every 100 females age 18 and over, there were 76.0 males.

Males had a median income of $26,716 versus $17,992 for females. The per capita income for the city was $11,476. About 26.1% of families and 32.9% of the population were below the poverty line, including 45.1% of those under age 18 and 22.0% of those age 65 or over.

Crime
With a crime rate of 60 per one thousand residents, Bogalusa has one of the highest crime rates in America compared to all communities of all sizes- from the smallest towns to the very largest cities. One's chance of becoming a victim of either violent or property crime here is one in 17. Within Louisiana, more than 92% of the communities have a lower crime rate than Bogalusa.

Economy

Bogalusa's economy has been linked to lumbering and its byproducts since the city's founding by the Great Southern Lumber Company chartered in 1902 by the Goodyears of Buffalo, New York. The sawmill was, for many years, the largest in the world. A paper mill was added in 1918. By 1938, the Goodyear family's mill had clear cut all the virgin longleaf yellow pine within hundreds of miles of Bogalusa and after an unprofitable effort to import redwood from California, their sawmill operations at the Great Southern Lumber Company also ended. Bogalusa's industry then shifted to paper milling as Goodyear's sawmill passed onto Gaylord Container Corporation which was then bought by Crown Zellerbach in 1955. By the mid 1960s the mill was producing some 1300 tons of paper daily with four machines. Georgia Pacific acquired the mill in 1986. Its brown paper successor owned the Bogalusa mill until 2002 when Gaylord was acquired by Temple-Inland Corporation, the area's largest employer.

The spill-over of industrial products into the Pearl River in August 2011 resulted in Federal fines of over one million dollars. The following year, 2012, Temple-Inland was acquired by International Paper headquartered in Memphis, TN and the mill came under new ownership. The Bogalusa mill still operates as a corrugated fiberboard plant making boxes and shipping containers. As of 2019 the plant remains the city's largest employer with 425 people. However production is much less than the 1960s with only two machines now in operation.

Arts and culture
The Robert "Bob" Hicks House was listed on the National Register of Historic Places  in 2015.
The Robert Hicks Foundation was established to carry on the work for civil rights. An annual award is made in his name.
Robert Indiana's painting "Louisiana" (1965) : "Just As in the Anatomy of Man Every Nation: Must have its Hind Part: The Fair City of Bogalusa"

Deacons for Defense is a 2003 television movie made about the 1965 civil rights struggle in Bogalusa. Directed by Bill Duke, it stars Academy Award-winner Forest Whitaker, with Ossie Davis and Jonathan Silverman.
A Bogalusa Civil Rights Museum is planned to open in the city in 2018, to commemorate the struggle in the 1960s and continuing work for social justice.
Robert Indiana's painting "Louisiana" (1965) : "Just As in the Anatomy of Man Every Nation: Must have its Hind Part: The Fair City of Bogalusa"

Government
The city charter designates a mayor and a council of seven members, five of whom are elected from the respective districts and two are elected at-large, all serving four-year terms.

Bogalusa is home to the 205th Engineer Battalion of the Louisiana Army National Guard.  This unit is part of the 225th Engineer Brigade, which is headquartered in Pineville, Louisiana, at Camp Beauregard.

Education 
Bogalusa operates its own public school system, Bogalusa City Schools, consisting of seven elementary schools, one junior high and one high school. As of 2020 there are over 3600 students enrolled and almost 230 teachers working for the district.

Northshore Technical Community College is located in Bogalusa. In 1930, it was the first trade school established in the state of Louisiana, and it is now a fully accredited community college.

Media
The local newspaper is the Bogalusa Daily News with one radio station, WBOX 920 AM & 92.9 FM.

Infrastructure

Highways
Bogalusa is located at the juncture of Louisiana Highways  10 running east–west and   21 running north–south. Bogalusa connects to  Bush, Louisiana

Rail
There is no passenger rail to Bogalusa but the Bogalusa Bayou Railroad (BBAY) serves Bogalusa's International Paper plant connecting it northward with the Canadian National line in Mississippi.

Air
The Bogalusa Airport, officially named the George R. Carr Memorial Air Field is owned by the city. It is located north of the city.

Police
The Police Department employs 35 officers and 12 reserves.

Notable people

 Kenderick Allen, NFL defensive lineman 2003-08
 Perry Brooks (1954–2010), football defensive tackle, Washington Redskins (1977–1984), Super Bowl XVII champion
 Jacob Brumfield (born in 1965 in Bogalusa), professional baseball outfielder from 1992 to 1999
 Al Clark, NFL player 1971-76
 James Crutchfield (1912–2001), barrelhouse blues piano player; raised in Bogalusa
 Jack Dunlap, NSA agent accused of spying for the Soviet Union
 Rodney Foil (1934-2018), forestry researcher, educator, and administrator at Mississippi State University.
 Bob Hicks, civil rights activist. See above.
 Trumaine Johnson, Grambling and professional football player; born in Bogalusa
 Yusef Komunyakaa (born in 1947 in Bogalusa), winner of 1994 Pulitzer Prize for Poetry; born James Willie Brown, Jr.
 Skip Manning (1934-), 1976 NASCAR Winston Cup Rookie of the Year
 John McGeever, NFL cornerback 1962-66
 Beth Mizell (born in 1952 in Bogalusa), state senator for Washington Parish
 Henry "Tank" Powell, represented Tangipahoa Parish in state legislature 1996–2008; member of Louisiana Board of Pardons
 Professor Longhair (1918-1980), funky pianist who inspired artists such as Dr. John; several of his songs are Mardi Gras anthems
 Snoozer Quinn (1907–1949), pioneer of jazz guitar; raised in Bogalusa
 Jared Y. Sanders, Sr., former governor, arranged tax breaks for GSL and helped the sawmill with startup   
 Jared Y. Sanders, Jr., former U.S. representative and state legislator, practiced law in Bogalusa early in 20th Century
 E.S.G., Hip-Hop musician
 JayDaYoungan (1998–2022),Hip-Hop musician
 Robert Benjamin Smith, former defensive end in the National Football League for the Minnesota Vikings and Dallas Cowboys
 Charlie Spikes, the "Bogalusa Bomber"; MLB player 1972–1980, New York Yankees, Cleveland Indians, Detroit Tigers, Atlanta Braves
 Clarence Triggs, unsolved murder
 Malinda Brumfield White (born 1967), member of Louisiana House of Representatives from Bogalusa
 Dub Williams, New Mexico legislator
 Curt Siegelin (1907-1982), four term mayor (1946-1970), MAYOR OF THE YEAR (1956), President of LMA (1949-1951), Exec Dir LA Dept of Commerce (1956-1960), Chairman of LA State Parks Commission (1956-1960)

References

Bibliography

 - Total pages: 386

Further reading

External links

 City of Bogalusa

Cities in Louisiana
Cities in Washington Parish, Louisiana
Company towns in the United States
Riots and civil disorder in Louisiana
African-American history of Louisiana
History of racism in Louisiana